Molly Bruggeman (born 19 June 1992) is an American rower. In the 2018 World Rowing Championships, she won a gold medal in the women's coxless four event. She also won a silver medal in the 2016 World Rowing Championships in the same event.

References

See also

American female rowers
World Rowing Championships medalists for the United States
Living people
1992 births
Pan American Games medalists in rowing
Pan American Games gold medalists for the United States
Rowers at the 2015 Pan American Games
Medalists at the 2015 Pan American Games
21st-century American women